Sainte-Marie-Lapanouze is a commune in the Corrèze department in central France.

Geography
The river Dordogne forms part of the commune's southern boundary; the Diège, a tributary of the Dordogne, forms part of its northeastern boundary.

Population

See also
Communes of the Corrèze department

References

Communes of Corrèze